Chhotu Ram Institute of Law is situated at Rohtak District of Haryana State in India. It is governed by Jat Education Society Rohtak named after Chhotu Ram. Dr. Rajiv Joon is Director of the Law College.

References

External links 
Jat Education Society, Rohtak 
Maharshi Dayanand University, Rohtak

Law schools in Haryana
Education in Rohtak
Maharshi Dayanand University